Armando Villegas (1926 – 29 December 2013) was a Peruvian-born Colombian painter, whose career spanned nearly six decades.

Villegas died on 29 December 2013, aged 87, in Bogotá, Colombia.

References

1926 births
2013 deaths
People from Pomabamba Province
Peruvian painters
Peruvian male painters
Colombian painters
Colombian male painters
Peruvian emigrants to Colombia
National University of Colombia alumni